Winchell is an unincorporated community in Brown County, Texas, United States.

History
Winchell was founded sometime before 1900 and was originally named Broadtown or Brown Town for E.J. Broad, who built a store in the area. Its name was changed to Winchell in 1903, most likely for B.L. Winchell, who was the president of the Fort Worth and Rio Grande Railway that built a track from there to Brady. The first postmaster was Charles Wilson. Other buildings sprang up along the track, which included a depot and several businesses. It had a cotton gin, several businesses, and 300 residents in 1914. A decade later, all buildings burned and were never rebuilt, causing the postal service to continue until 1958. In the early 1930s, Winchell had two churches, three businesses, and several scattered houses along the highway. Another business was built in 1940 and had 90 residents, then lost two businesses in 1962. Both businesses disappeared in 1965. Its population was estimated to have dropped to 10 in 2010, then grew to 20 in 2019.

Geography
Winchell is located approximately 21 miles southwest of Brownwood along U.S. Highway 377 in southwestern Brown County, near the McCulloch County line.

Education
In the 1920s, Winchell had a two-story school building with four teachers employed. By the next decade, its high school joined the Brookesmith Independent School District, while the elementary school followed suit in the 1940s. Today, Winchell is served by the Rochelle Independent School District.

References

Unincorporated communities in Brown County, Texas
Unincorporated communities in Texas